The Ferry Street Bridge was constructed across the Black Rock Canal, in Buffalo, New York, in 1913.

The bridge is a bascule bridge, a kind of lift bridge, built by the Strauss Bascule Bridge Company, and is considered a rare and historic design.

The bridge underwent a rebuild from 2014 to 2016.  The rebuild cost $8 million.

References    

Bridges in Buffalo, New York
Bascule bridges in New York (state)